KMBQ-FM (99.7 FM) is a radio station  broadcasting a modern adult contemporary format. Licensed to Wasilla, Alaska, United States, the station serves the Mat-Su Valley area. The station is currently owned by Seattle-based Ohana Media Group. Its studios are located in Downtown Anchorage and its transmitter is north of Wasilla.

External links
Q99.7 KMBQ-FM official website

Modern adult contemporary radio stations
Radio stations established in 1989
MBQ
Wasilla, Alaska